A university of applied sciences (UAS), nowadays much less commonly called a polytechnic university or  vocational university, is an institution of higher education and sometimes research that provides vocational education and grants academic degrees. It should not be confused with vocational schools or technical schools that do not meet the strict standards of higher education nor have the ability to grant officially accredited academic degrees.

In some countries, a vocational university more precisely grants professional degrees like professional bachelor's degree, professional master's degree and professional doctorates. The term is not officially used in many countries and an assignment to a certain type of university in a certain country's educational system is therefore difficult. The UK once had a very extensive vocational university sector with its polytechnic system dating back to the mid-19th century. Vocational universities are often regulated and funded differently (for example, by the local government rather than the state) from research-focused universities, and the degrees granted are not necessarily interchangeable.

Education

The education at vocational universities combines teaching of both practical skills and theoretical expertise. It can be contrasted with education in a usually broader scientific field, which may concentrate on theory and abstract conceptual knowledge. There is also the historical background that an educational institution was called a university in the Middle Ages only if a certain classical canon of subjects was taught (typically including philosophy, medicine and theology). In modern times, other subjects, namely natural and engineering sciences, became more important, but institutions of tertiary education focusing on these subjects and not offering the classical canon have been until recently or are still denied the prestigious denomination "university" in all countries. They had to use other, more general terms (which in many languages are false friends of the English term "high school", sometimes with modifiers), including Fachhochschule in German, Haute École in French (Belgium and Switzerland), Hogeschool in Dutch, Høyskole in Norwegian, Scuola universitaria professionale in Italian, etc.

There are different varieties, including vocational universities of applied sciences (also named polytechnics or institutes of technology), vocational universities of liberal arts, etc. In recent years, many vocational universities have received full university status, such as the University of Music and Performing Arts Vienna, Austria (Universität für Musik und darstellende Kunst Wien, formerly Hochschule für Musik und Darstellende Kunst Wien), or the Örebro University, Sweden (formerly Örebro Högskola). There are also some establishments which now have full university status but continue to use their former names, such as the Royal Institute of Technology in Stockholm, Sweden.

In Europe

Austria

Finland

In Finland, vocational universities are called Ammattikorkeakoulu (Yrkeshögskola in Swedish, translated "university of applied sciences", literally "vocational high school"). They focus on vocational education and do not grant licentiate or doctorate degrees.

Notice: certain universities are called korkeakoulu because they effectively have only one faculty, e.g. Teatterikorkeakoulu, the Theatre Academy, whereas universities with several faculties are called yliopisto. The term ammattikorkeakoulu (AMK) creates some confusion with korkeakoulu, because traditionally AMK's were not considered universities. A graduate of university of applied sciences (ammattikorkeakoulu) is generally not eligible for doctoral studies in Finnish universities without formally completing a master's degree from a university (yliopisto).

Germany

The term vocational university is not used. In contrast to traditional German universities, a Fachhochschule (translated "university of applied sciences") has a more practical profile. Universities of applied sciences grant academic bachelor's degrees and master's degrees. In some federal states, research-intensive universities of applied sciences have the permission to grant doctoral degrees (e.g. Hesse or Saxony Anhalt). Otherwise, doctoral programs must be carried out in cooperation with degree-awarding institutions such as universities. Furthermore, Berufsakademie is a college type strongly inspired by the dual education system. A Berufsakademie is called a university of cooperative education in English and only grants bachelor's degrees. This type of institution was first created in the German state of Baden-Württemberg and now exists in Hamburg, Hesse, Lower Saxony, Saarland, Saxony, Schleswig-Holstein, and Thuringia, but not in the other German states. In 2009, Baden-Württemberg transformed its Berufsakademie into a new type of institution, which until now only exists in that state, a "Duale Hochschule". In English, this type of institution is also called university of cooperative education, but a Duale Hochschule also offers master's degrees.

Greece

In Greece, comparable institutions to the vocational universities (or perhaps better to the universities of applied sciences) are the technological educational institutes (TEIs). These constitute part and parcel of the higher education in Greece and offer in their own capacity bachelor's and master's degrees, and soon doctorate degrees.

On the other hand, the term college in Greece may refer, among others, to the institutions that are officially titled Centres of Post-lyceum (secondary) Education. These have a solely professional, i.e. non-academic, orientation according to existing Greek law, and are so far only private. However, they run in collaboration with foreign authorities, such as universities and accreditation organisations, that may recognise them academically. They may offer professional bachelor degrees of minimum three years, as well as master's and doctorate degrees.

Italy

An Istituto tecnico superiore (abbreviated ITS – Higher Technical Institute) is an Italian tertiary educational institution. They were established in 2008, and are modelled on the Fachhochschule system of Germany. Programs have a duration of two or three years, and require a high school degree for access.

Netherlands

As of January 29, 2008, a Dutch hogeschool (HBO) may call itself a "university of applied sciences" in English. Just like the German 'Fachhochschule', these HBO institutes firstly have a practical profile. They focus primarily on teaching the practicing of a profession at the highest professional level, at the state of the art. This as opposed to proper research universities (Dutch: "universiteiten"), that focus on both the highest level of professional practice, as well as practicing research with proper scientific methodology (how to solve problems/challenges on a scientific level of thinking), including scientific ethics, legal, and philosophy. This so-called binary system of professional and academic education co-exists with upper secondary vocational education, which provides vocational education at EQF levels 1-4 for equal, similar or different professions.  

Universities of applied sciences offer associate's degrees, bachelor's degrees and master's degrees. From 2022 onward there will be pilots on Professional Doctorates.

Hogescholen in the Netherlands have been provided with the right to conduct research by the revised Higher Education and Research Act (WHOO)2010.

Sweden
The main difference between universities (universitet) and vocational universities (högskola, official translation university college) is that only the former ones have the right to award doctorate degrees in all subjects they offer. Some vocational universities have been given such rights within limited areas of research.

Switzerland

United Kingdom

In Asia

Mainland China 
China is home to the largest vocational education system in the world. In 2018, Mainland China had a total of about 11,700 vocational schools.

Examples:
 BN Vocational School (Beijing)
 Fashion Institute (Ningbo, Zhejiang)
 NingBo Vocational Education Central School (Ningbo, Zhejiang)
 Hunan Mass Media Vocational and Technical College (Changsha, capital of Hunan)
 Hunan Chemical Vocational Technology College (Zhuzhou, Hunan)
 Hunan Railway Professional Technology College (Zhuzhou, Hunan)
 Guangsha College of Applied Construction Technology (Zhejiang)
 Liming Vocational University (Quanzhou, Fujian)
 Qingdao Vocational and Technical College (Qingdao)
 Vocational Academy of Art (Zhejiang)
 Yuying College of Vocational Technology (Zhejiang)
 Zhejiang Vocational College of Economic & Trade (Zhejiang)
 Zibo Vocational Institute (Zibo, Shandong)
 Zhaoqing University (Zhaoqing, Guangdong)
 Suqian Economic and Trade Vocational College (Shuyang)

Hong Kong 

 Technological and Higher Education Institute of Hong Kong (THEi)
 Hong Kong Institute of Vocational Education (IVE)

Iran

University of Applied Science and Technology 

The University of Applied Science and Technology (UAST) is a public university administrated by Ministry of Science, Research and Technology with various branches all over the Provinces of Iran. This university helps to increase skill level of employed personnel in various sectors of economic field and graduates of higher education and professional skills that are lacking in administrative. It is an educational system inspired and derived from 'Community College' in the United States. With more than 1500 education center in all corner of Iran. UAST confers degrees in over 100 programs at the associate, bachelor's and master's degree levels.

Technical and Vocational University 

The Technical and Vocational University (TVU) is one of Institutes of Higher Education under control of the Ministry of Science, Research and Technology. The university has more than 176 schools and colleges across the country and more than 220 thousand students is one of the largest universities in Iran.

Malaysia
There are five public vocational universities in Malaysia:
 Universiti Malaysia Pahang (UMP)
 Universiti Malaysia Perlis (UniMAP)
 Universiti Teknikal Malaysia Melaka (UTeM)
 Universiti Tun Hussein Onn Malaysia (UTHM)
 Universiti Malaysia Kelantan (UMK)

Sri Lanka
In 2009, the first University of Vocational Technology was established under the purview of the Ministry of Vocational and Technical Training. There are also nine College of Technology in Sri Lanka.

Taiwan
In Taiwan, vocational university is called University of science and technology or University of technology.

 National Taiwan University of Science and Technology (Taiwan Tech)
 National Taipei University of Technology (Taipei Tech)
 National Kaohsiung University of Science and Technology
 National Yunlin University of Science and Technology (Yen Tech)

See also
Community college
Further education
Institute of technology
Technical school
Trade school

Notes

References

External links
 List of vocational universities PDF
 Higher Vocational Education in Switzerland
 Higher Vocational Education in China
 Higher Vocational Education in China
 Higher Vocational Education in Czech Republic
 Higher Vocational Education in Russia
The Copenhagen Process
Education system in Finland

Educational stages
Higher education
Types of university or college

Tertiary education